Red Ridge is a ridge just west of Robson Glacier in the Gonville and Caius Range, in Victoria Land. The descriptive name was given by Frank Debenham of the British Antarctic Expedition (1910–13) during his plane table survey in 1912.

References

Ridges of Victoria Land
Scott Coast